Michelle Nicolle is an Australian jazz singer. She has been nominated for ARIA Awards for Best Jazz Album in 2001 (After The Rain),  2004 (The Crying Game) and in 2009 (The Loveliest Night).

Discography

Albums

Awards and nominations

ARIA Music Awards
The ARIA Music Awards is an annual awards ceremony that recognises excellence, innovation, and achievement across all genres of Australian music. It commenced in 1987.

! 
|-
| 2001
| After the Rain
| rowspan="3"| Best Jazz Album
| 
| rowspan="3" |
|-
| 2004
| The Crying Game
| 
|-
| 2009
| The Loveliest Night
| 
|-

Mo Awards
The Australian Entertainment Mo Awards (commonly known informally as the Mo Awards), were annual Australian entertainment industry awards. They recognise achievements in live entertainment in Australia from 1975 to 2016. Michelle Nicolle won two awards in that time.
 (wins only)
|-
| 2000
| Michelle Nicolle
| Jazz Vocal Performer of the Year
| 
|-
| 2002
| Michelle Nicolle
| Jazz Vocal Performer of the Year
| 
|-

References

External links
Michelle Nicolle — Jazz Singer

Australian musicians
Living people
Australian women singers
Australian jazz singers
Year of birth missing (living people)